is a Japanese former actor and voice actor.

Notable roles

TV
Private Detective Mike (Episode 5) (2002, Nippon Television)
Aikurushii (Episode 2) (2005, Tokyo Broadcasting System)

TV commercials
Sanyo (The Bra to Kodoru) (1994)
Otsuka Pharmaceutical Co. Pocari Sweat Beanstalk (1997)
Sugakiya Foods Co., Ltd. (1996) (Pan fried prawn noodle heaven)
Wacom (1997)

Dubbing roles

Live-action films
The Adventures of Sharkboy and Lavagirl in 3-D (additional Japanese voice-dubbing role)
Charlie and the Chocolate Factory (Augustus Gloop) (Philip Wiegratz) (DVD/Blu-ray Editions)
Zathura (Walter) (Josh Hutcherson) (DVD/UMD Editions)

References

External links
 58Group Page

1992 births
Japanese male voice actors
Living people